Pustularia cicercula is a species of sea snail, a cowry, a marine gastropod mollusk in the family Cypraeidae, the cowries.

Subspecies
The following subspecies are recognized :
 Pustularia cicercula cicercula (Linnaeus, 1758)
Pustularia cicercula takahashii Moretzsohn, 2007
 Pustularia cicercula tricornis (Jousseaume, 1874)
 Pustularia cicercula tuamotensis Lorenz, 1999
Pustularia cicercula avrilae Heiman, 2009: synonym of Pustularia cicercula tuamotensis Lorenz, 1999
Pustularia cicercula lienardi (Jousseaume, 1874): synonym of Pustularia cicercula tricornis (Jousseaume, 1874)

Description
The length of the shell attains 17.7 mm.

Distribution
This species and its subspecies occur in the Red Sea and in the Indian Ocean off Kenya, the Mascarene Basin, Mauritius, Réunion and Tanzania.

References

 Jousseaume, F., 1874. Description de quelques espèces nouvelles de coquilles appartenant aux genres Murex, Cypraea & Natica. Revue et Magasin de Zoologie Pure et Appliquée (3)2: 3-25
 Verdcourt, B. (1959). The cowries of the East African Coast: Supplement II. JEANHS XXIII (100): 130–134
 Heiman, E.L. & Mienis, H.K., 2008. - Cypraea tricornis Jousseaume, 1874: a study of the type material. Triton 18: 9-10
 Lorenz F. (2014). Monograph of the genus Pustularia (Gastropoda: Cypraeidae). Harxheim: ConchBooks. 130 pp
 Liu, J.Y. [Ruiyu] (ed.). (2008). Checklist of marine biota of China seas. China Science Press. 1267 pp.

External links
 Linnaeus, C. (1758). Systema Naturae per regna tria naturae, secundum classes, ordines, genera, species, cum characteribus, differentiis, synonymis, locis. Editio decima, reformata (10th revised edition), vol. 1: 824 pp. Laurentius Salvius: Holmiae

Cypraeidae
Gastropods described in 1758
Taxa named by Carl Linnaeus